Ludwig Deutsch (13 May 1855 – 9 April 1935) was a French painter of Austrian origin, who settled in Paris and became a noted Orientalist artist. Having studied at the Vienna Academy of Fine Arts from 1872 to 1875, he moved to Paris in 1878, where he became associated with other Orientalist painters. Most of his works were painted in his studio in Paris, but he had visited Egypt on several journeys from 1885 to 1898. In 1919, he became a French citizen and started to write his name as Louis Deutsch.

Life and career
Details of Ludwig Deutsch's life are obscure. He was born in Vienna in 1855 into a well-established Jewish family. His father Ignaz Deutsch was a financier at the Austrian court.

He received his early art training at the Akademie der Bildenden Künste (Academy of Fine Arts Vienna) under the tutelage of Anselm Feuerbach (1875–1877). In 1877, when Feuerbach retired as a teacher, Deutsch and some others students attempted to enter the class of Leopold Carl Müller, who had moved to Paris in 1876, but initially were refused entry. In 1878 Deutsch was finally accepted. At around this time, he may also have studied with Jean-Paul Laurens. In Paris, Deutsch made the acquaintance of artists Arthur von Ferraris, Jean Discart and Rudolf Ernst, who became his lifelong friend. Through these friendships, Deutsch developed an interest in Orientalist art.

Around 1880, he broke his contacts with Vienna and settled permanently in Paris. He established a studio at the Rue Le Pelletier in Paris and began to exhibit paintings with much success.

Though his earliest Orientalist subjects appeared in 1881, Deutsch's first documented journeys to the Middle East were made in 1885, 1890, and 1898, when he visited Egypt. Throughout the 1890s, he visited Egypt at least three times. Like many of his contemporaries, he found inspiration in the North African light, colours, scenery and customs. He collected a vast quantity of  Oriental objects, including tiles, furniture, arms, pipes, fabrics, and costumes, which he would subsequently use in his paintings.

Work 
His early work focused primarily on historical subjects, but after visiting Egypt, he concentrated on Orientalist scenes. He was particularly interested in capturing the rich, opulent scenes of Cairo and its environs. The detail in his paintings is excellent. He was prolific, producing many paintings with the same theme – prayers, guards, musicians, street vendors etc. In order to produce paintings in large volume, he created a very economical approach, using the same settings with different subjects and activities to create an impression of variety.

Many of Ludwig Deutsch's paintings are now in the Shafik Gabr Collection. Amongst his best known works are: The Scribe, painted 6 years after Paul Joanowits did Bashi-Bazouks Before a Gateway but in the same location, and Musical Interlude. Among Austrian Orientalist painters, his works are considered to be some of the most sought after by collectors.

Like many of his contemporaries, including Paul Joanovitch, Rudolf Ernst and Jean-Léon Gérôme, Deutsch made extensive use of photography to ensure archaeological accuracy in his painted renderings of local architectural features (e.g. tiles, ablaq stone work, and the traditional  woodwork) in what has been described as "documentary realism". Nissan N. Perez, Curator of Photography at the Israel Museum, wrote for example, that "the details in masonry and the angle of view in Deutsch's paintings El Azhar - The Arab University in Cairo (1890) and The Scribe (1904)" are doubtlessly inspired by photographs of Cairo-based photographer Gabriel Lekegian of the same places. This allowed him to use the Orient as inspiration, but to produce most of his paintings in his Paris studio.

Selected paintings

Select list of paintings

 The Domino Players, 1882
 An Orientalist Amateur, 1883 (Painting exhibited at the Salon of French Artists, and now presumed lost)  
 The Musician, 1883
 The Sentinel, 1885
 News from Sudan, 1885
 The Answer, 1886
 The Sherbert Vendor,  1886
 The Hour of Prayer, 1887
 The Snake Charmers, 1888 
 Court of El Azhar University, Cairo, 1890
 The Healer, 1891
 The Orange Seller, 1892
 The Palace Guard, 1892
 The Emir's Guard, 1893
 The Scribe, 1894
 The Scholar, 1895
 The Chess Game 1896
 The Philosopher, 1897
 The Offering, 1897
 Prayer at the Tomb, 1898
 Leaving the Mosque, 1900
 The Learned, 1900
 Interior of Mosque, 1902
 The Harem Watchman 1903
 The Koran School, 1905
 Morning Prayer, 1906
 The Narghil Smoker, 1907
 Le Maitre, 1907
 The Procession of the Mahmal through the Streets of Cairo, 1909 
 At Prayer, 1911
 The Scribe, 1911
 The Treasure Chest, 1920
 At Prayer,  1923
 The Fortune Teller, 1927 
 Musical Interlude, 1932

See also

List of Orientalist artists

References

1855 births
1935 deaths
19th-century Austrian painters
19th-century Austrian male artists
20th-century Austrian painters
Austrian Jews
Austrian male painters
Orientalist painters
20th-century Austrian male artists